Epicephala eriocarpa is a moth of the family Gracillariidae. It is found in Fujian, China.

The larvae feed on Glochidion eriocarpum.

References

Epicephala
Moths described in 2012